Roseivivax halodurans is a species of bacteria, the type species of its genus. It is aerobic and bacteriochlorophyll-containing, first isolated from the charophytes on the stromatolites of a saline lake located on the west coast of Australia. It is chemoheterotrophic, Gram-negative, motile, rod-shaped and with subpolar flagella. Its type strain is OCh 239T (= JCM 10272T).

References

Further reading

External links

LPSN
Type strain of Roseivivax halodurans at BacDive -  the Bacterial Diversity Metadatabase

Rhodobacteraceae
Bacteria described in 1999